Kathleen "Kitty" Rehberg (née Kaesser; born October 16, 1938) is an American politician in the state of Iowa. A Republican, she served in the Iowa Senate as the representative for the 14th district from 1997 to 2003 and as the representative for the 12th district from 2003 to 2005.

Early life 
Rehberg was born on October 16, 1938, in Cedar Rapids, Iowa. Her parents are Nina and Delbert Kaesser. She attended Rowley Consolidated School and Kirkwood Community College. Rehberg was a farmer. She continued to function in that capacity before and after serving as a state senator for the Republican Party in Buchanan County.

Political career 
Rehberg was first elected to the Iowa Senate as the representative for the 14th district in the 1996 general election, after successfully beating Democrat Larry Murphy.

Rehberg worked to eliminate parts of the inheritance tax and cut income taxes by 10 percent. She was also widely known for encouraging the development of entrepreneurs within her community. This stunt and other beliefs put her at stark odds with some of her party members. "What we all came on is we thought government was too intrusive into our lives and was taking too much of our money -- our hard-earned money," Rehberg said.

References

1938 births
Living people
Politicians from Cedar Rapids, Iowa
Kirkwood Community College alumni
Farmers from Iowa
Women state legislators in Iowa
Republican Party Iowa state senators
21st-century American women